Michael Gibbons (19 February 1890 – 22 August 1952) was a Scottish professional footballer who made 140 appearances in the Scottish League for Falkirk as an inside forward and centre half.

Personal life 
Gibbons served as a private in McCrae's Battalion of the Royal Scots during the First World War.

Honours 
Falkirk

 Scottish Cup: 1912–13

Career statistics

References 

Scottish footballers
Royal Scots soldiers
Scottish Football League players
McCrae's Battalion
British Army personnel of World War I
Falkirk F.C. players
Association football wing halves
1890 births
1952 deaths
Footballers from Fife
Association football inside forwards
Cowdenbeath F.C. players
East Fife F.C. players